Universe (stylized as UNIVERSE) is a Korean mobile app and web platform created by the video game developer NCSoft and operated by its entertainment subsidiary Klap.

The global K-pop entertainment platform revealed all 38 participating artists individually from November 12, 2020, to August 29, 2022. The platform will be officially closed and its service will be transferred to Dear U bubble on February 17, 2023.

Development
Ahead of its launch day, Universe surpassed four million pre-registered users on both the App Store and Google Play. As of January 2021, K-pop fans from 188 countries around the world including South Korea, the United States, Japan, Taiwan, Indonesia, and Brazil completed pre-registration with 80% of these users residing overseas. Two months after its launch, Universe achieved more than five million global downloads with a total 692 exclusive contents released. Four months after its launch, the K-pop entertainment platform surpassed ten million downloads.

Within ten months of its release, Universe surpassed 20 million downloads. The proportion of overseas users increased to 89% while the total number of original content released rose to 5,122 with a cumulative view count of 21.46 million. As of July 2022, after the Universe service completely reorganized, with a total of 6,288 original contents, the monthly revisit rate increased 10 times, the cumulative number of views reached 24 million, and the number of global downloads exceeded 24 million.

Artists

Current
 
AB6IX
Astro
Ateez
Brave Girls
CIX
Choi Ye-na
Cravity
DKZ
Drippin
Epex
Ghost9
(G)I-dle
Ha Sung-woon
Heo Young-ji
Ive
Iz*One
Jo Yu-ri
Kang Daniel
Kard
Kep1er
Kim Bum
Kwon Eun-bi
Lee Dong-wook 
Monsta X
Park Ji-hoon
Ren
Viviz
WEi
Weki Meki
WJSN
Wonho
Yoo Yeon-seok
Youngjae (Got7)

Former
Oh My Girl 
Yerin 
SF9 
The Boyz 
Lightsum

Universe Originals

Series
Kang Daniel – Agent Blackjack K (10 Episodes)
Monsta X – Area 51: The Code (10 Episodes)
Iz*One – Fantastic I*z: Hidden School (10 Episodes)

Radio
Kang Daniel – Kang Daniel Film Festival (7.25 MHz)
The Boyz – Star THE Bs D.D.D (12.06 MHz)
Monsta X – Smart Ones (5.14 MHz)
Park Jihoon – The Next Door (3.26 MHz)
Astro – Hot Topics! (2.23 MHz)
Iz*One – Oneiric Diary (10.29 MHz)
Ateez – The Clues (10.24 MHz)
(G)I-dle – Not That Close (5.02 MHz)
WJSN – Universe War (2.25 MHz)
AB6IX – Care to Join? (5.22 MHz)
CIX – Seeds of Temptation (7.23 MHz)
SF9 – Catch Up! (10.05 MHz)

Universe Music
All artists that have joined Universe will participate in its "Universe Music" series, with various content including music videos released each month.

Concerts

Fan meetings

Universe Fan Event

Universe Fan Party

Notes

References

External links
 Official website

NCSoft
Social networking services
Internet properties established in 2021